Serious Charge is the first EP by Cliff Richard and The Drifters, released in the UK in May 1959 as the soundtrack for the 1959 film of the same name and produced by Norrie Paramor. The EP is a 7-inch 45 RPM vinyl record, released in mono with the catalogue number Columbia SEG 7895. All four tracks were recorded on 28 April 1959 at Abbey Road Studios. It was released nearly a year before the first UK EP Chart was published.

Track listing
Side one
"Living Doll" (Lionel Bart)
"No Turning Back" (Bart)

Side two
"Mad About You"(Bart)
"Chinchilla" (Randy Starr, Dick Wolf) An instrumental by The Drifters.

References

1959 debut EPs
Film soundtracks
1959 soundtrack albums
EMI Records soundtracks
EMI Records EPs
Albums produced by Norrie Paramor